Hammer is a surname. Notable people with the surname include:

A.J. Hammer (born 1966), American television and radio personality
Angela Hutchinson Hammer (1870–1952), American newspaper publisher
Anna M. Hammer (1840–1910), American philanthropist and temperance movement leader
Anthony Hammer, Australian actor
Armand Hammer (1898–1990), U.S. physician, entrepreneur, oil magnate and art collector
Armie Hammer (born 1986), American actor
Barbara Hammer (1939–2019), American film maker
Beatrice Hammer (born 1963), French writer
Bernhard Hammer (1822–1907), Swiss president
Bob Hammer (born 1930), American jazz pianist, composer and arranger
Caroline Hammer (1832–1915), Danish photographer
Cec Hammer (1926–2013), Australian rules footballer
Charles Christian Hammer (1952–2004), American classical guitarist
Chuck Hammer, American guitarist and composer
Doc Hammer, American musician, actor, film and television writer, voice actor, and painter
Edward E. Hammer (1931-2012), engineer who was at the forefront of fluorescent lighting research
Ellen Hammer (1921-2001), American historian
Emanuel Frederick Hammer (1926–2005), American psychologist and author
Emerson Hammer (1856–1940), American politician
Ernst Hammer (1884-1957), highly decorated Generalleutnant in the Wehrmacht during World War II
Ernest E. L. Hammer (1884–1970), American lawyer, politician, and judge
Frederic E. Hammer (1909–1980), New York politician and judge
Friedrich Julius Hammer (1810–1862), German poet
Heathcote Hammer (1905-1961), Australian World War II general
JD Hammer (born 1994), American Major League Baseball pitcher for the Philadelphia Phillies
Jan Hammer (born 1948), composer
Jay Hammer (born 1944), American actor
John Hammer (born 1935), founder of sporting competitions for older players
Jon Ludvig Hammer (born 1990), Norwegian chess player
Jørgen Hammer (born 1991), Norwegian association football player
Joshua Hammer (born 1957), American journalist
Julie Hammer (born 1955), Royal Australian Air Force air vice marshal, first woman to be promoted to one-star and two-star rank
Kim Hammer (born 1958), member of the Arkansas House of Representatives
Kristian Hammer (born 1976), Norwegian Nordic combined skier
Lance Hammer, American independent filmmaker
Lisa Hammer (born 1967), American filmmaker, actress, composer and singer
Marion P. Hammer, American gun rights activist, first female president of the National Rifle Association
Michael Hammer (disambiguation), multiple people
Moshe Hammer (born 1946), Canadian violinist
Peter Ladislaw Hammer (1936-2006), Romanian-born American mathematician
Reuven Hammer (born 1933), Conservative Jewish rabbi, scholar, author and lecturer
Sarah Hammer (born 1983), American professional racing cyclist and two-time Olympic silver medalist
Simon Christian Hammer (1866–1932), Norwegian writer and journalist
Victor Hammer (1882–1967), Austrian-born American painter, sculptor, printer and typographer
William C. Hammer (1865-1930), U.S. Representative from North Carolina
William Joseph Hammer (1858–1934), American electrical engineer and aviator; president of the Edison Pioneers
Zevulun Hammer (1936–1998), Israeli politician

See also
Joseph von Hammer-Purgstall (1774–1856), Austrian orientalist
MC Hammer (born 1962), stage name of American rapper Stanley Kirk Burrell